Diana Sorel is a 1921 Italian silent film directed by Gustavo Serena and starring Tilde Kassay.

Cast
 Irma Berrettini 
 Gino D'Attino 
 Silvana Di San Giorgio 
 Tilde Kassay as Diana Sorel  
 Gustavo Serena 
 Pier Camillo Tovagliari

References

Bibliography
 Aldo Bernardini & Vittorio Martinelli. Il cinema muto italiano: I film degli anni venti, 1921. Nuova ERI, 1996.

External links

1921 films
1920s Italian-language films
Films directed by Gustavo Serena
Italian silent feature films
Italian black-and-white films